Actimicrobium is a Gram-negative, strictly aerobic and non-motile genus of bacteria in the family of Oxalobacteraceae with one known species (Actimicrobium antarcticum).

References

Burkholderiales
Bacteria genera
Monotypic bacteria genera